John William French (October 22, 1888 – November 8, 1970) was a Canadian politician and a Member of the Legislative Assembly of Quebec.

Background

He was born in Scotstown, Eastern Townships on October 22, 1888 and married Dorothy Isabella MacLeod in the state of New York in 1935.  He was the brother and political successor of Charles Daniel French.

Local Politics

French served as a city councillor from 1925 to 1935 and as a school board member from 1935 to 1940 in Cookshire, Quebec.

Member of the legislature

His brother Charles, who was the Member of the Legislative Assembly (MLA) for the provincial district of Compton died in 1954.  A by-election was called to fill the vacancy and French successfully ran as a Union Nationale candidate to take over his brother's function.  French was defeated by Liberal candidate Fabien Gagnon in the 1956 election.

Death

He died on November 8, 1970.

References

1888 births
1970 deaths
People from Estrie
Union Nationale (Quebec) MNAs